Thomas George Vernon Inman  (1904–1989) was an eminent  Anglican bishop in the third quarter of the 20th century. He was educated at Selwyn College, Cambridge and ordained in  1931. He was Assistant Missioner at the  Wellington College Mission, Walworth before emigrating to South Africa. He then held  curacies at Estcourt and St Paul, Durban. Later he was vicar of the church and archdeacon  of the area. After this he was bishop of Natal from 1951 to 1974 then Dean of the Province of South Africa. A Sub-Prelate of the Order of St John of Jerusalem, he died on 4 July 1989.

Notes 

1904 births
Alumni of Selwyn College, Cambridge
Anglican archdeacons in Africa
20th-century Anglican Church of Southern Africa bishops
Anglican bishops of Natal
1989 deaths
Sub-Prelates of the Venerable Order of Saint John
Deans of Maritzburg